Konrad Cebula  (born 22 March 1983) is a Polish former footballer who played as a midfielder.

Career
Cebula started his career with Cracovia in 2002, and retired in 2019 with Gdovia Gdów in the regional league.

References

External links
 

1983 births
Living people
Polish footballers
Association football forwards
MKS Cracovia (football) players
Proszowianka Proszowice players
Górnik Wieliczka players
Stal Stalowa Wola players
Górnik Zabrze players
Sandecja Nowy Sącz players
Kolejarz Stróże players
Limanovia Limanowa players
Okocimski KS Brzesko players
Footballers from Kraków
Association football midfielders